Daboya-Mankarigu is one of the constituencies represented in the Parliament of Ghana. It elects one Member of Parliament (MP) by a first past the post system of election. The Daboya-Mankarigu constituency is located in the West Gonja District of the Savannah Region of Ghana.

Boundaries 
The seat is located entirely within the West Gonja District of the Savannah Region of Ghana.

Members of Parliament

See also 

 List of Ghana Parliament constituencies
 List of political parties in Ghana

References 

Parliamentary constituencies in the Savannah Region